The Combined Islands cricket team was a cricket team that represented the cricket-playing islands of the Lesser Antilles, excluding Barbados and Trinidad and Tobago who fielded their own teams. They played in 13 Shell Shield tournaments from 1965–66 to 1980–81, when they won their first title and were subsequently disbanded into Leeward Islands and Windward Islands. Those two teams had first-class status before 1980–81, but competed together in the Shell Shield.

History 
The Combined Islands played 54 first-class games, winning 11, drawing 19 and losing 24. 52 of those games were in the Shell Shield tournament, with the other two games both coming in the 1961–62 season – a Pentangular Tournament preliminary round loss to British Guiana, was followed by a home defeat to the touring Indian side that same season. From then on, the team only existed as an entity for the Shell Shield, with the British Leeward Islands and British Windward Islands fielding independent teams against touring squads, and also playing first-class matches between each other.

Inaugural Shell Shield 
In 1965–66, the team was among the five that played for the inaugural Shell Shield. After two draws against Jamaica and Barbados, the team went down to British Guiana, before winning the last game against Trinidad and Tobago to finish third in the table and record their first victory.

It took a further four seasons before the Combined Islands returned to the Shell Shield – the Leeward and Windward teams played games, but the matches they played did not count for points.  The Combined team was back for the 1969–70 tournament, though, and duly lost all four games, with no player averaging more than 26 with the bat. This was the first season that the Shillingford cousins – Irvine and Grayson, who both represented West Indies at Test level – played for the Combined Islands and the two went on to play most Shell Shield matches for the Combined Islands together until 1976–77, Irving scoring more than 2,500 runs while Grayson took nearly 100 wickets for the team.

Building a team 
In 1970–71, the Combined Islands registered their first win in five years, but still finished last behind Guyana – despite beating Guyana by 50 runs, the team lost their other three matches, and Guyana finished two points ahead. The 1971–72 season went by without a single win, although they gained a lead on first innings, but in 1972–73, the Combined Islands beat Jamaica to finish fourth after Elquemedo Willett took six for 40 in the second innings – which stood as a team record for two seasons – to help bowl Jamaica out for 132. By this time, most of the players that were to become team regulars for the remainder of its history had debuted - in addition to the Shillingford cousins, there was Vance Amory, Jim Allen, Mike Findlay, Norbert Philip, Viv Richards (who went on to play 121 Tests for the West Indies), Andy Roberts, Lockhart Sebastien and the aforementioned Willett, who all played for the Combined Islands until 1978, and four of them until the end in 1981. However, the team still failed to win more than one match a season. In 1973–74, they lost three of the four games and finished last again, despite Roberts and Philip both taking more than three wickets a match at a bowling average less than 20. That season also included their only List A game, a five-run win over the touring England side representing MCC. The Islands batted first, making 204 for 6 in 50 overs with 102 from Jim Allen and 78 from Livingstone Sargeant. Dennis Amiss made 114 for the tourists, but Grayson Shillingford (six overs for 7) and Andy Roberts (ten overs for 27) limited the scoring. Three wickets fell for 12 near the end, and the MCC finished on 199 for 6.

Title challengers 
The next season, they got their best position in the Shell Shield thus far, going unbeaten through the season and also recording their first away win – a 163-run win over Barbados, their highest win yet, which also included a second-innings century from Allen and a new record bowling analysis of six for 35 from Roberts - who finished the season with 25 wickets at a bowling average of 12.72. Allen and Richards also averaged above 50 with the bat, and after three unbeaten matches initially they set themselves up for a potential trophy win. A first innings win or an outright win in their final match at the Queen's Park Oval in Trinidad and Tobago would have seen them take the trophy, but they finished with a 30-run first innings deficit, and after being set a target of 283 to win their openers Sebastien and Michael Camacho put on 101 for the first wicket. Trinidad's bowlers came back, and after two run outs and three wickets from Imtiaz Ali and Raphick Jumadeen the Combined Islands were 276 for 9. Captain Findlay and number 11 Hugh Gore added six for the final wicket before time ran out - thus, the scores were tied at the end of the match, the match was drawn since the Islands had not lost the final wicket (in which case it would have been a tie) and the Shell Shield title went to Guyana instead of the islands.

The next season saw them fall back to fourth place, however, with none of the four matches seeing more than 325 overs of play in four days as the Combined Islands drew all four games – with two ending before the first innings were completed. Irvine Shillingford still managed to hit 257 runs in his three innings, averaging 85.66 with the bat. 1976–77 saw improvement in the table again, as they once again fought for the title – they were tied with Barbados on points before the very last game, but after conceding four 50+ scores –including 113 from David Murray - and a total of 511, the team surrendered a first-innings deficit of 276 despite 124 from Richards, and though Allen made 101 in the second innings and Philip took three for 15 to boost his seasonal wicket-tally to 20, Barbados made it to the target of 53 with six wickets to spare. Thus the Islands finished second in the table, tied with Trinidad and Tobago.

The Combined Islands finished second for the third time in four seasons in 1977-78, but this time they were in last place before the final round, when they beat Trinidad and Tobago by seven wickets to avoid the last place and propel themselves up the table to a shared second place with Jamaica. All-rounder Norbert Philip took more than 20 wickets for the second year running, and also hit 240 runs, while off spinner Derick Parry took a team record seven for 100 in the first innings of a drawn game against champions Barbados. The following season, the Combined Islands were once again on the heels of Barbados, trailing by two points before the final game in Trinidad. Despite a 109-run lead after four half-centuries and six for 90 from Parry, Combined Islands were bowled out for 181 in the second innings, and David Murray put on 27 with Inshan Ali to give Trinidad and Tobago the win and the second place in the table.

The next season saw the Combined Islands return to the runners-up spot, after winning two games in a season for the first time, and before the final game in Barbados they trailed their hosts by 11 points after a drawn game in Trinidad two weeks earlier. After being put in the field by the Barbados captain, Combined Islands batted to a total of 257, before centuries from Emmerson Trotman and Thelston Payne helped Barbados to a total of 555 - with Viv Richards getting the best bowling returns for the Islands with two for 71. However, he only made 3 with the bat, as his team were bowled out for 279 - losing by an innings and 19 runs, and finishing second again. Earlier on in the season, Parry had beaten his own best-innings bowling record, with nine for 76 against Jamaica, in a match where he took 15 for 101 - a record for all West Indies domestic teams which stood for 16 years. Parry finished the season with 25 wickets.

Shell Shield victory, and dissolution 
Finally, after four runner-up spots in the preceding six seasons, it was the Combined Islands' turn to win the Shell Shield trophy in 1980-81. After starting with a draw in Trinidad, the Combined Islands won both home games - first an innings win over Jamaica, in which Andy Roberts took 11 for 101 and completed a hat-trick, and then a 165-run win over Guyana which sealed the trophy with one game to play - against Barbados, who were 35 points behind. Despite going down by an innings and 16 runs, the Combined Islands finished 12 points ahead of Barbados - who had been docked nine of those points due to a slow over rate. The Test stars Richards and Roberts topped the batting and bowling tables respectively - Richards making 323 runs despite being dismissed for 13 and 4 by Barbados, while Roberts took 24 wickets in the three games not against Barbados - and one for 48 against the Bajans.

The innings defeat was the end of the Combined Islands team. The West Indies Cricket Board made the decision to split the team into Windward and Leeward Islands, and the first match of the 1981-82 Shell Shield was played between these two teams - the Leeward Islands, whose team included 10 players who had played for the Combined team the previous season, won by 57 runs, and has continued to be the more successful of the two sides with three first-class titles. The Windwards are yet to win a single one.

First class statistics

Batting and fielding

Bowling

Grounds 
Out of 30 first-class home games, the most were played in Warner Park on Saint Kitts, which hosted seven games. The team played cricket on a total of eight different islands, with Antigua getting six, Saint Lucia five, Grenada four, Dominica and Saint Vincent three, while Montserrat and Nevis hosted one game each.

Records

Team records 
 Highest total for: 481 v Jamaica, 1980-81 Shell Shield, Basseterre, 23–26 January 1981
 Highest total against: 555 by Barbados, 1979-80 Shell Shield, Bridgetown, 25–28 April 1980
 Lowest total for: 53 v Barbados, 1973-74 Shell Shield, Basseterre, 5–8 January 1974
 Lowest total against: 85 by Trinidad and Tobago, 1965-66 Shell Shield, Castries, 11–14 March 1966

Batting records 
 Highest innings: 168 not out, Viv Richards v Trinidad and Tobago, 1980-81 Shell Shield, Queen's Park Oval, 17–20 January 1981
 Highest partnerships for each wicket:

Bowling records 
 Most wickets in an innings: 9-76, Derick Parry v Jamaica, 1979-80 Shell Shield, Kingston, 21–24 March 1980
 Most wickets in a match: 15–101, Derick Parry v Jamaica, 1979-80 Shell Shield, Kingston, 21–24 March 1980

References 
 Combined Islands First-Class Records 
 CricketArchive Scorecard Oracle
 CricketArchive Season Index
 Whither the Windwards? from CaribbeanCricket.com
 CricInfo

Former senior cricket clubs of the West Indies
Cricket in Antigua and Barbuda
Cricket in Dominica
Cricket in Grenada
Cricket in Montserrat
Cricket in Saint Kitts and Nevis
Cricket in Saint Lucia
Cricket in Saint Vincent and the Grenadines
West Indian first-class cricket teams